Carmel Bird (born 1940) is an Australian writer of novels, short stories and essays. She has written books on the art of writing, and has edited anthologies of essays and stories. In 2016, she was awarded the Patrick White Literary Award.

Writing career
Her first collection of short stories (1976) was titled Dimitra and Other Stories, and her most recent novel (2019) is Field of Poppies. In 2016 she published the novel Family Skeleton. In 2010 she published the novel Child of the Twilight. Her most recent collection of short fiction is the ebook The Dead Aviatrix (2017). My Hearts Are Your Hearts (2015) is also a collection of short fiction. Her most recent non-fiction is Fair Game (2015).

In 2016, she was awarded the Patrick White Literary Award "in recognition of her outstanding contribution to Australian literature".

Awards and nominations
 1991 — shortlisted in the Miles Franklin Award for The Bluebird Cafe
 1991 — shortlisted in Victorian Premier's Award for The Bluebird Cafe
 1996 — shortlisted in the Miles Franklin Award for The White Garden
 1996 — shortlisted in the NSW Premier's Award; the Aurealis Award; the Ned Kelly Award for The White Garden
 1998 — shortlisted in the Miles Franklin Award for Red Shoes
 2001 — winner of the Philip Hodgins Memorial Medal at the Mildura Writer's Festival
2001 — film based on story 'A Telephone Call for Genevieve Snow' (director Peter Long) winner of Silver Lion, Venice Film Festival
 2016 — winner of the Patrick White Award

Bibliography

Novels

Bird, Carmel (2010). Child of the Twilight
Bird, Carmel (2016). Family Skeleton
Bird, Carmel (2019). Field of Poppies

Collections
Bird, Carmel (1976). Dimitra
Bird, Carmel (1983). Births,Deaths and Marriages

Bird, Carmel (1988). Woodpecker Point 

Bird, Carmel (2005). The Essential Bird 
Bird, Carmel (2015). My Hearts Are Your Hearts
Bird, Carmel (2017). The Dead Aviatrix

Anthologies (edited)

Non-fiction

Bird, Carmel (2010). Writing the Story of Your Life
Bird, Carmel (2013). Dear Writer Revisited 
Bird, Carmel (2015). Fair Game
Bird, Carmel (2022). Telltale

Children's

Bird, Carmel (2012). The Fabulous Finola Fox

Book reviews

References and notes

External links 
 CarmelBird.com — official website of Carmel Bird

1940 births
Living people
Australian women novelists
Australian women short story writers
Writers from Tasmania
Writers from Victoria (Australia)
20th-century Australian novelists
20th-century Australian women writers
20th-century Australian short story writers
Australian Book Review people